Hacı Karay (1950 – June 1994) was a Turkish person of Kurdish descent.

He was born in Yüksekova, Hakkari, to Fehim Karay (father).

On 13 February 1993, he participated in the action of closing shops in Yüksekova in support of the hunger strikes staged at Diyarbakır Prison.

He had connections to Savaş Buldan. Along with fellow businessmen Savaş Buldan and Adnan Yıldırım, he was abducted by armed persons from Çınar Hotel in Yeşilyurt, İstanbul, on 3 June 1994. The abducted persons were found dead on 4 June 1994 on the road of Yukarıkaraş village of Yığılca district in Bolu.

In March 1995, his sisters Gülcan and Gülsen Karay traveled to a rural area in southeastern Turkey to join the PKK.

See also
List of kidnappings
List of unsolved murders

References

External links
(contains the Susurluk reports in English)

1950 births
1990s missing person cases
1994 deaths
Formerly missing people
Kidnapped people
Male murder victims
Missing person cases in Turkey
People from Hakkâri
Turkish drug traffickers
Turkish murder victims
Turkish people of Kurdish descent
Unsolved murders in Turkey
1994 murders in Turkey